Edgar Ziesemer (1895–1971) was a German cinematographer.

Selected filmography
 Derby (1926)
 State Attorney Jordan (1926)
 Venus im Frack (1927)
 A Crazy Night (1927)
 One Plus One Equals Three (1927)
 Always Be True and Faithful (1927)
 Yacht of the Seven Sins (1928)
 Because I Love You (1928)
 Tragedy at the Royal Circus (1928)
 At Ruedesheimer Castle There Is a Lime Tree (1928)
 Black Forest Girl (1929)
 Scapa Flow (1930)
 Kavaliere vom Kurfürstendamm (1932)
 Thunder, Lightning and Sunshine (1936)
 The Vagabonds (1937)
 Autobus S (1937)
 Sherlock Holmes (1937)
 Monika (1938)
 Frieder und Catherlieschen (1940)

Bibliography
 Kester, Bernadette. Film Front Weimar: Representations of the First World War in German films of the Weimar Period (1919-1933). Amsterdam University Press, 2003.

External links

1895 births
1971 deaths
German cinematographers
Film people from Berlin